The Tunaij, also spelled as Tanaij (singular Tunaiji ), is an Arab tribe in the United Arab Emirates (UAE). The Tunaij have mostly settled in Dhaid, the inland oasis town of Sharjah, and the Ras Al Khaimah town of Rams. A small number of Tunaij also settled at Hamriyah.

At the turn of the 19th century, there were some 4,000 Tunaij in the Northern Emirates, of whom 1,500 were Bedouin. Influential in tribal politics because they could raise a force of some 500 fighting men, the Bedouin Tunaij used Dhaid as a centre and a fortified tower protected the 70-odd Tunaij houses there (the Na'im maintained a similar arrangement at Dhaid). The Tunaij have been linked to the Bani Qitab.

The Tunaij of Rams were mostly involved in pearl fishing and, during the pearling season, both Bedouin Tunaij and Shihuh would come to the coast to work as seasonal labour.

References

Tribes of the United Arab Emirates
Tribes of Saudi Arabia
Arab groups
Arabic-language surnames
History of the United Arab Emirates